Yevgeny Kafelnikov was the defending champion, but did not take part in 1999.

Seeds

Draw

Finals

Top half

Bottom half

References

Main Draw

1999 Gerry Weber Open